Come to My House is a 1927 American silent drama film directed by Alfred E. Green and starring Olive Borden, Antonio Moreno and Ben Bard. Based on the novel of the same name by Arthur Somers Roche.

Cast
 Olive Borden as Joan Century  
 Antonio Moreno as Floyd Bennings  
 Ben Bard as Fraylor  
 Cornelius Keefe as Murtaugh Pell  
 Doris Lloyd as Renee Parsons 
 Richard Maitland as Jimmy Parsons

References

Bibliography
 Solomon, Aubrey. The Fox Film Corporation, 1915-1935: A History and Filmography. McFarland, 2011.

External links

1927 films
1927 drama films
Silent American drama films
Films directed by Alfred E. Green
American silent feature films
1920s English-language films
Fox Film films
American black-and-white films
Films based on American novels
1920s American films